Philip Cary Plait (born September 30, 1964), also known as The Bad Astronomer, is an American astronomer, skeptic, and popular science blogger. Plait has worked as part of the Hubble Space Telescope team, images and spectra of astronomical objects, as well as engaging in public outreach advocacy for NASA missions. He has written two books, Bad Astronomy and Death from the Skies. He has also appeared in several science documentaries, including How the Universe Works on the Discovery Channel. From August 2008 through 2009, he served as president of the James Randi Educational Foundation. Additionally, he wrote and hosted episodes of Crash Course Astronomy, which aired its last episode in 2016.

Early life

Plait grew up in the Washington, D.C. area. He has said he became interested in astronomy when his father brought home a telescope when Plait was 5 years old or so. According to Plait, he "aimed it at Saturn that night. One look, and that was it. I was hooked."

Education and research

Plait attended the University of Michigan and received his PhD in astronomy at the University of Virginia in 1995 with a thesis on supernova SN 1987A, which he studied with the Supernova Intensive Study (SINS).

During the 1990s, Plait worked with the COBE satellite and later was part of the Hubble Space Telescope team at NASA Goddard Space Flight Center, working largely on the Space Telescope Imaging Spectrograph. In 1995, he published observations of a ring of circumstellar material around SN 1987A, which led to further study of explosion mechanisms in core-collapse supernovae. Plait's work with Grady, et al. resulted in the presentation of high-resolution images of isolated stellar objects (including AB Aurigae and HD 163296) from the Hubble Space Telescope, among the first of those recorded. These results have been used in further studies into the properties and structure of dim, young, moderate-size stars, called Herbig Ae/Be stars, which also confirmed results observed by Grady, et al.

Public outreach

After his research contributions, Plait concentrated on educational outreach. He went on to perform web-based public outreach for the Fermi Gamma-ray Space Telescope and other NASA-funded missions while at Sonoma State University from 2000 to 2007. In 2001, he coauthored a paper on increasing accessibility of astronomy education resources and programs.

A large proportion of his public outreach occurs online. He established the badastronomy website in 1998 and the corresponding blog in 2005. The website remains archived but is no longer actively maintained, while the blog has continued, through several changes of platform, to the present day.

His first book, Bad Astronomy: Misconceptions and Misuses Revealed, from Astrology to the Moon Landing "Hoax" deals with much the same subject matter as his website. His second book, Death from the Skies, describes ways astronomical events could wipe out life on Earth and was released in October 2008.

Plait's work has also appeared in the Encyclopædia Britannica Yearbook of Science and the Future and Astronomy magazine. He is also a frequent guest on the SETI Institute's weekly science radio show Big Picture Science.

Plait has contributed to a number of television and cinema productions, either onscreen as host or guest or in an advisory role offscreen. He hosted the three-part documentary series "Phil Plait's Bad Universe" on the Discovery Channel, which first aired in the United States on August 29, 2010 but was not picked up as a series. He has appeared in numerous science documentaries and programs including How the Universe Works. Plait was a science advisor for the 2016 movie Arrival and the 2017 CBS TV Series Salvation. He was the head science writer of the 2017 show Bill Nye Saves the World on Netflix.

Scientific skeptical advocacy

From 2008 to 2009, Plait served as the president of the James Randi Educational Foundation, which promotes scientific skepticism, a position he eventually stepped down from in order to focus on the "Bad Universe" television project. He has also been a regular speaker at widely attended science and skepticism events and conferences, such as The Amazing Meeting (TAM), Northeast Conference on Science and Skepticism (NECSS), and DragonCon. Plait writes and speaks on topics related to scientific skepticism, such as advocating in favor of widespread immunization.

Personal life

Plait currently resides in Boulder, Colorado with his wife, Marcella Setter, and daughter. In a 2009 interview, Plait stated that his daughter is interested in astronomy and science, as well as anime and manga. Setter and Plait run Science Getaways, a vacation company that provides science-based adventures.

Internet presence

Badastronomy.com

Plait began publishing explanatory Internet postings on science in 1993. Five years later, Plait established Badastronomy.com with the goal of clearing up what he perceived to be widespread public misconceptions about astronomy and space science in movies, the news, print, and on the Internet, also providing critical analysis of several pseudoscientific theories related to space and astronomy, such as the "Planet X" cataclysm, Richard Hoagland's theories, and the Moon landing "hoax". It received a considerable amount of traffic after Plait criticized a Fox Network special accusing NASA of faking the Apollo missions.  Astronomer Michelle Thaller has described Badastronomy.com, as well as Plait's book and essays called Bad Astronomy, as "a monumental service to the space-science community".

Blog
In 2005, Plait started the Bad Astronomy blog. In July 2008, it moved to a new host, Discover Magazine. While it is primarily an astronomy blog, Plait also posts about skepticism, pseudoscience, and antiscience topics, with occasional personal and political posts. On November 12, 2012, the Bad Astronomy blog moved to Slate magazine. Plait told Richard Saunders in an interview that "they [Slate] are very supportive... a new community."  Revisiting old posts, Plait stated, "I've written about everything, when you've written 7,000 blog posts you've pretty much written about every topic in astronomy."

On February 1, 2017 the Bad Astronomy blog moved to SyfyWire where it was hosted until October 2022

Online video
In September 2011, Plait spoke at a TED (conference) in Boulder, his hometown. His conference explained how to defend Earth from asteroids.

Plait taught Astronomy on the YouTube educational series Crash Course for 47 episodes, from January 15, 2015 to February 12, 2016.

Books

Media appearances

Awards and honors

 The 2007 Weblog Awards – Bad Astronomy was awarded "Best Science Blog," having tied with Climate Audit.
 In March 2008, Plait had an asteroid named after him by the late astronomer Jeff Medkeff. Asteroid  was named 165347 Philplait.
 In 2009, Bad Astronomy was named among Time.com's 25 Best Blogs.
 In 2013, Plait received the National Capital Area Skeptics' Philip J. Klass Award
 In 2016, Plait was awarded the David N. Schramm Award for High Energy Astrophysics Science Journalism by the American Astronomical Society for his 2015 article entitled "A Supermassive Black Hole's Fiery and Furious Wind."

References

External links

Bad Astronomy Blog
Bad Astronomy Archived Website
 
 
 

1964 births
American astronomers
American science writers
American skeptics
Critics of conspiracy theories
Living people
Science bloggers
Sonoma State University faculty
Space advocates
University of Michigan alumni
University of Virginia alumni